Grabowiec or Grabówiec may refer to:

In Greater Poland Voivodeship (west-central Poland):
Grabowiec, Szamotuły County
Grabowiec, Turek County
Grabówiec, Greater Poland Voivodeship

In Kuyavian-Pomeranian Voivodeship (north-central Poland):
Grabowiec, Grudziądz County
Grabowiec, Toruń County
Grabówiec, Brodnica County
Grabówiec, Lipno County

In Łódź Voivodeship (central Poland):
Grabowiec, Piotrków County
Grabowiec, Sieradz County

In Lublin Voivodeship (east Poland):
Grabowiec, Opole Lubelskie County
Grabowiec, Radzyń Podlaski County
Grabowiec, Zamość County

In Masovian Voivodeship (east-central Poland):
Grabowiec, Lipsko County
Grabowiec, Płock County
Grabowiec, Siedlce County
Grabowiec, Węgrów County
Grabówiec, Ciechanów County
Grabówiec, Pułtusk County
Grabówiec, Sierpc County

In Podlaskie Voivodeship (north-east Poland):
Grabowiec, Bielsk County
Grabowiec, Hajnówka County
Grabowiec, Siemiatycze County

In Pomeranian Voivodeship (north Poland):
Grabowiec, Człuchów County
Grabowiec, Gmina Bobowo
Grabowiec, Gmina Osiek
Grabowiec, Gmina Smętowo Graniczne
Grabowiec, Wejherowo County
Grabowiec, Braniewo County
Grabowiec, Iława County

In other voivodeships:
Grabowiec, Lubusz Voivodeship (west Poland)
Grabowiec, Subcarpathian Voivodeship (south-east Poland)
Grabowiec, Świętokrzyskie Voivodeship (south-central Poland)
Grabowiec, West Pomeranian Voivodeship (north-west Poland)